Isaïa Cordinier (born 28 November 1996) is a French professional basketball player for Virtus Bologna of the Italian Lega Basket Serie A (LBA) and the EuroLeague. He was selected by the Atlanta Hawks with the 44th overall pick in the 2016 NBA Draft.

Early life and career 
Cordinier started playing basketball at age seven, in Vence. He is of Martiniquais descent through his father. He lived in Martinique, from 2006 to 2009, and later joined the youth academy of Sharks d’Antibes.

Professional career

Antibes Sharks (2012–2014)
Cordinier made his debut on Antibes’ senior men’s team, in the French second division, in November 2012, when he was 15 years and 11 months old. During the 2013-14 campaign, he made his debut in the French top-tier level Pro A.

ALM Évreux (2014–2015)
For the 2014–2015 season, Cordinier transferred to second-division side ALM Evreux Basket. In 23 games, he averaged 4.9 points and 2.1 rebounds for Evreux.

Denain-Voltaire (2015–2016)
Prior to the 2015–16 season, Cordinier penned a deal with another second-division team, Denain ASC Voltaire. In April 2016, Cordinier was selected to play in the Nike Hoop Summit, where he tallied eight points, five rebounds and one assist, in 21 minutes off the bench. Later that month, he declared for the NBA Draft. On June 13, 2016, Cordinier was one of 13 different international underclassmen (including one of four different Frenchmen) to enter the 2016 NBA Draft.

Return to Antibes Sharks (2016–2019)
Cordinier joined Olympique Antibes of the French top-flight LNB Pro A, for the 2016–17 season. He made 30 Pro A appearances for Antibes in 2016–17, averaging 6.5 points and 2.8 rebounds a contest.

Nanterre 92 (2019–2021)
On June 5, 2019, Cordinier signed a two-year deal with Nanterre 92 of the LNB Pro A. During the 2020–21 season, he averaged 12 points, 4.9 rebounds, 3.7 assists and 1.5 steals in LNB Pro A, along with 15.8 points, 5.2 rebounds, 3.2 assists and 1.7 steals in the EuroCup, and was named to the All-EuroCup First Team for the 2020–21 season.

Virtus Bologna (2021–present)
On October 5, 2021, Cordinier signed a two-year contract with Virtus Bologna of the Lega Basket Serie A. After having ousted Lietkabelis, Ulm and Valencia in the first three rounds of the playoffs, on 11 May 2022, Virtus defeated Frutti Extra Bursaspor by 80–67 at the Segafredo Arena, winning its first EuroCup and qualifying for the EuroLeague after 14 years.  However, despite having ended the regular season at the first place and having ousted 3–0 both Pesaro and Tortona in the first two rounds of playoffs, Virtus was defeated 4–2 in the national finals by Olimpia Milano.
 
On 29 September 2022, after having ousted Milano in the semifinals, Virtus won its third Supercup, defeating 72–69 Banco di Sardegna Sassari and achieving a back-to-back, following the 2021 trophy.

NBA draft rights
Cordinier was drafted by the Atlanta Hawks, in the 2016 NBA draft (2nd round, 44th overall, fourth of five Frenchmen taken), and played for the Hawks in the 2016 NBA Summer League.

On July 13, 2018, Cordinier's draft rights were traded to the Brooklyn Nets, along with a future 2nd-round pick, for Jeremy Lin and picks.

In September 2021, the Nets renounced to Cordinier's draft rights, making him an unrestricted free agent.

National team career 
Cordinier was named to the French Under-18 junior national team that competed at the 2014 FIBA Europe Under-18 Championship, in Turkey. He saw the court in nine games during the tournament, tallying 9.7 points, 5.6 boards, 2.6 assists and 1.0 steal per contest.

Personal life 
His father Stéphane is a former professional handball player, who represented France in the 1996 Olympic Games in Atlanta and won bronze at the 1997 World Handball Championship. Isaia also played handball before turning to basketball.

References

External links 

Isaïa Cordinier at draftexpress.com
Isaïa Cordinier at eurobasket.com
Isaïa Cordinier at eurocupbasketball.com
Isaïa Cordinier at nbadraft.net
Isaïa Cordinier at RealGM.com

1996 births
Living people
ALM Évreux Basket players
Atlanta Hawks draft picks
Black French sportspeople
Denain Voltaire Basket players
French expatriate basketball people in Italy
French men's basketball players
French people of Martiniquais descent
Nanterre 92 players
Olympique Antibes basketball players
Sportspeople from Créteil
Shooting guards
Small forwards